The Sigatoka disease complex consists of three fungi of banana:

Mycosphaerella fijiensis  Black sigatoka
Mycosphaerella musicola  Yellow sigatoka
Mycosphaerella eumusae  eumusae leaf spot

See also
List of banana and plantain diseases

Banana diseases
Fungal fruit diseases